CBPP may refer to:

 CBPP, a radio station in Prince Edward Island, Canada
Contagious bovine pleuropneumonia, a lung disease
Commons-based peer production
Center on Budget and Policy Priorities
Cholesterol-binding pancreatic proteinase, an enzyme